Jelita Septriasa or better known as Acha Septriasa (born in Jakarta, Indonesia on September 1, 1989) is an Indonesian actress and singer of Minangkabau descent.

Biography
Septriasa was born Jelita Septriasa in Jakarta, Indonesia, on 1 September 1989 to Sagitta Ahimshah and Rita Emza; she is the third daughter of their six children. Her younger sister, Juwita Maritsa, who resembles her, is also an actress. She did her schooling at Muhammadiyah Elementary School 6 from 1995 to 2001, then State Junior High School 73 from 2001 to 2004; both are in Tebet, South Jakarta. Her high school was State Senior High School 82, Jakarta, which she attended from 2004 to 2007.

Septriasa began her career in modelling as the Gadis Sampul pageant, held by the teen magazine Gadis in 2004. Her first film role was in 2005's Apa Artinya Cinta? (What is the Meaning of Love?), in which she had a supporting role. The following year, she rose to fame with the success of Heart, in which she starred opposite Nirina Zubir and her then-boyfriend Irwansyah. She also sang for the soundtrack album together with Irwansyah which produced by Melly Goeslaw and her husband, got double platinum; two of her singles, "Sampai Menutup Mata" ("Until I Close My Eyes") and the duet "My Heart", received international airplay.

The following year, Septriasa and Irwansyah starred in the teen romance Love is Cinta. She also sang a duet with him for the film. That same year she was identified as the fourth highest-paid Indonesian actress, at Rp. 180 million (US$15,000) per film. She released her first solo album, Keputusan Hati (Heart's Decision), in August 2009. That same year she hosted the Indonesian variety show Dahsyat and played a role in Krazy Crazy Krezy.

In 2010. Septriasa starred opposite Ayu Azhari and Julia Perez in Sst... Jadikan Aku Simpanan (Sst... Make Me Your Mistress). She also released Menembus Impian (Achieving  Dreams).

 Septriasa is studying film production at Limkokwing University in Kuala Lumpur, she also frequently returns to Indonesia; she shot her role for Love Story, a story based on a traditional legend, opposite Irwansyah, while still taking classes in Malaysia.  she has no plans to release a new album, as it is too time consuming. In 2012 she announced that after finishing her studies she intended to work an office job; however, that same year she was cast in two films, which she worked on first.

Style
Septriasa is known for portraying girl next door type characters in her films. As such, she mostly prefers to keep her hair light brown or chestnut.

Personal life
Acha formerly dated her Heart and Love is Cinta co-star, Irwansyah; they broke up in 2008. Her friends circle are mostly male.

Septriasa enjoys playing sports and travelling. She started learning to swim at the age of one, then took up football in junior high school and on the contrary, she became the basketball team captain in high school. She also enjoys cycling and regularly plays futsal with her friends. She uses long holidays to travel, and often travels abroad.

Acha married Vicky Kharisma on 11 December 2016 in Jakarta.  The couple met during their higher studies in Malaysia.

Filmography

Film
 Apa Artinya Cinta? (What is the Meaning of Love?; 2005)
 Heart (2006)
 Love is Cinta (2007)
 In the Name of Love (2008)
 Love (2008)
 Krazy Crazy Krezy (2009)
 Kado Spesial Buat Kakak (Special Gift for Sister; 2009)
 Sst... Jadikan Aku Simpanan (Sst... Make Me Your Mistress; 2010)
 Menembus Impian (Achieving Dreams; 2010)
 Love Story (2011)
 Test Pack (2012)
 Broken Hearts (2012)
 Recto Verso (2012)
 99 Cahaya di Langit Eropa (2013-2014)
 Bangun Lagi dong Lupus  (2013)
 Lamaran (2014)
 Bulan Terbelah di Langit Amerika (2015-2016)
 Koala Kumal (2016)
 Sabtu Bersama Bapak (2016)
 Shy Shy Cat (2016)
 Kartini (2017)
 Jaga Pocong (2018)
 Hanum & Rangga (2018)
 99 Nama Cinta (2019)
 Daemon Mind (2021)
 June & Kopi (2021)
 Layla Majnun (2021)
 Anwar: The Untold Story (2023)

Discography

 OST Heart (2006)
 OST Love is Cinta (2007)
 Keputusan Hati (Heart's Decision; 2009)
 Kimi no Tameni (2021) (labeled by Pony Canyon)

TV Shows
 INBOX (SCTV)
 !nsert (Trans TV)
 dahSyat (RCTI)

Adverstiment
 Natur-E
 Citra Soap
 Kapal Api
 Lactamil
 Bodrex Migra

Awards and nominations

References
Footnotes

Bibliography

External links
 

Living people
1989 births
21st-century Indonesian women singers
Actresses from Jakarta
Indonesian child actresses
Indonesian female models
Indonesian pop singers
Indonesian television actresses
Minangkabau people